Carlos Alexandre Rodrigues do Nascimento (born April 18, 1983), commonly known as Carlos Olivinha, or simply Olivinha, is a Brazilian professional basketball player that currently plays for Flamengo of Novo Basquete Brasil. At 6'8" (2.03 m), he can play at either the small forward or power forward positions, with power forward being his main position. He was born in Rio de Janeiro.

Professional career
In the Brazilian League's 2009–10 regular season, Olivinha averaged 20.8 points and 10.4 rebounds per game.

National team career
Olivinha has also been a member of the senior men's Brazilian national basketball team.  He made his debut with the senior team at the 2009 Marchand Continental Championship Cup, averaging 3.3 points and 1.3 rebounds per game for the team.  He also competed for the gold-medal winning Brazilian team at the 2009 FIBA AmeriCup, seeing action in four games off the bench for the Brazilians. He also played at the 2015 FIBA AmeriCup.

NBB career statistics

NBB regular season

NBB playoffs

References

External links
 FIBA Profile
 LatinBasket.com Profile
 NBB Player Profile 

1983 births
Living people
Basketball players at the 2015 Pan American Games
Brazilian men's basketball players
Esporte Clube Pinheiros basketball players
Flamengo basketball players
Novo Basquete Brasil players
Pan American Games gold medalists for Brazil
Pan American Games medalists in basketball
Power forwards (basketball)
Small forwards
Unitri/Uberlândia basketball players
Medalists at the 2015 Pan American Games
Basketball players from Rio de Janeiro (city)